English recording artist Olly Murs has released seven studio albums, twenty-five singles and twenty one music videos on recording labels Epic and Sony subsidiary Syco. Olly rose to prominence in the United Kingdom after being a contestant on The X Factor during its sixth series, ultimately finishing in second place on 12 December 2009. During his time on the show, Murs appeared on the number-one charity single "You Are Not Alone" alongside the other finalists. His debut single, "Please Don't Let Me Go" was released on 27 August 2010—where it became his second number-one single and first as a solo artist. The accompanying album, Olly Murs was released on 26 November, where it debuted at number two, and was preceded by the number four single "Thinking of Me" on 19 November. The singles "Heart on My Sleeve" and "Busy" were also released from the album on 27 March and 27 May 2011—peaking at number twenty and forty-five in the UK respectively.

Second album, In Case You Didn't Know was released on 28 November 2011, debuting at number-one in the United Kingdom. The lead single, "Heart Skips a Beat", which featured rap duo Rizzle Kicks, was released on 19 August 2011. The single debuted at number-one in the UK with weekly sales of over 109,000 copies—also topping the charts in Germany and Switzerland and reaching the top ten in Austria and Ireland. The second single, "Dance with Me Tonight", preceded the album's release on 20 November and debuted at number-two. On its third week charting, the single climbed to the number-one position, marking Murs' third solo number-one single. A third single, "Oh My Goodness" was released from the album on 2 April 2012, peaking at number thirteen in the UK.

Murs released his third studio album, Right Place Right Time, on 26 November. The album's lead single, "Troublemaker" featuring American rapper Flo Rida, was released on 18 November and peaked at number one in the UK, his fourth number one to date. Murs released his fourth studio album, Never Been Better, on 24 November 2014 and the album's first single, "Wrapped Up" featuring Travie McCoy on 16 November 2014.

Studio albums

Extended plays

Singles

As lead artist

As featured artist

Promotional singles

Other charted songs

Guest appearances

Music videos

Notes

References

Discographies of British artists